Bangladesh–European Union relations are the foreign relations between Bangladesh and European Union. The EU is the largest export destination of Bangladesh. The present ambassador of the EU to Bangladesh is Rensje Teerink.

History
In 2016 the Bangladesh-EU Dialogue on Migration Management was held in Meghna state guest house in Dhaka. The dialogue focused on irregular migrations and ways to manage it and raise awareness about it in Bangladesh. The EU has expressed its disappointment over new regulations concerning NGOs in 2016.

Cultural relations
The EU has campaigned to improve labor conditions, democracy and freedom of expression in Bangladesh. In 2013 Bangladesh signed the Sustainability compact with the EU to strengthen labor conditions in the country. The EU has also promoted the abolition of the death penalty in Bangladesh.

Economic relations
In 2001 the EU-Bangladesh cooperation agreement was signed which laid the foundation of trade relations. The European Union provided Bangladesh duty-free access to the Union market under the Everything But Arms (EBA) initiative. The European Union is Bangladesh's largest trading parting accounting for 24 percent Bangladesh's total trade. Bangladesh in the unions 35 largest trading partner. Clothing makes 90 percent of all export from Bangladesh to the EU. EU exports consists mostly of machinery and transport equipment at 49 percent. The Everything But Arms scheme is expected to end in 2021 when Bangladesh is predicted to graduate to the developing country bracket.

References

 
European Union